Harpal Singh Tiwana (8 August 1935 - 19 May 2002) was an Indian playwright and film and theatre director known for his Punjabi-language plays and films.

His two ventures into film making Long Da Lishkara and Diva Bale Sari Raat became landmarks in Punjabi cinema. He also directed two television productions – Sanjhi Deewar and an unfinished project on Maharaja Ranjit Singh.

His famous plays include Sirhind di Deewar. He established Punjab Kala Manch at Patiala along with his wife to promote local artists. Both Tiwana and his wife Neena Tiwana are graduates from the National School of Drama. Neena Tiwana and his son Manpal Tiwana are also playing a key role in promoting the theatre in Punjab. He also has a daughter Luna Tiwana.

Harpal died in a road accident near Palampur in Himachal Pradesh, on 19 May 2002, was cremated at Badungar cremation ground at Patiala. The Harpal Tiwana Foundation was set up in his memory after his death.

Filmography
Long Da Lishkara (1983)
Diva Bale Sari Raat (1990)
Sanjhi Deewar (television)

References

External links
 
 

Dramatists and playwrights from Punjab, India
Punjabi film producers
Punjabi-language film directors
National School of Drama alumni
1935 births
2002 deaths
Indian male dramatists and playwrights
Indian theatre directors
Punjabi-language writers
20th-century Indian film directors
20th-century Indian dramatists and playwrights
People from Ludhiana district
Film producers from Punjab, India
Film directors from Punjab, India
20th-century Indian male writers